Gorin may refer to
Gorin, an air base in Khabarovsk Krai, Russia
Gorin (river), a river in Khabarovsk Krai, Russia
Gorin (surname) 
Gorin v. United States, United States Supreme Court case involving Mikhail Gorin, a Soviet intelligence agent
South Gorin, Missouri, a city in United States
Furmint, white Hungarian wine grape known as Görin or Gorin